Calytrix ecalycata is a species of plant in the myrtle family Myrtaceae that is endemic to Western Australia.

It blooms between August and November producing yellow star-shaped flowers.

Found on sand-plains, valley flats, ridges and road-verges on the Lesueur Sandplain in the northern Wheatbelt region of Western Australia where it grows on sandy-clay-loamy soils over granite or sandstone.

References

Plants described in 1990
ecalycata
Flora of Western Australia